The phrase cloak and dagger describes situations involving intrigue, secrecy, espionage, or mystery.

Cloak and Dagger may also refer to:

Music
 Cloak & Dagger (The Upsetters album) (1973)
 Cloak & Dagger (Wet Wet Wet album) (1992)
 Cloak and Dagger, a 1983 album by Witchfynde
 "Cloak and Dagger", a 1981 song a song by Daniel Amos from ¡Alarma! (album)
 "Cloak and Dagger", a 1989 song a song by Black Sabbath from Headless Cross
 "Cloak and Dagger", a 1984 song a song by Nik Kershaw from Human Racing

Other uses
 Cloak and Dagger (comics), a Marvel Comics superhero duo
 Cloak & Dagger (TV series)
 Cloak and Dagger (1946 film), an espionage film
 Cloak & Dagger (1984 film), a thriller film
 Cloak & Dagger (video game), an Atari video game
 Cloak and Dagger (radio series), an NBC radio series

See also
 "Clock and Dagger", an episode of Man Finds Food